The Namibia women's national field hockey team represents Namibia in women's international field hockey competitions and is controlled by the Namibia Hockey Union, the governing body for field hockey in Namibia.

Tournament record

Africa Cup of Nations
 1990 – 
 1994 – 
 2005 – 
 2022 – 6th

African Olympic Qualifier
 2007 – 6th
 2015 – 4th
 2019 – 5th

African Games
 1995 - 4th
 1999 - 4th
 2003 - 6th

Commonwealth Games
1998 – 12th

FIH Hockey Series
2018–19 – Second round

See also
Namibia men's national field hockey team

References

African women's national field hockey teams
National team
Field hockey